is a former Japanese baseball player. He was most recently the position player coach for the Chunichi Dragons in Japan's Nippon Professional Baseball.

Career
As a professional, Tateishi was a utility player for the Nankai Hawks over a span of 7 years. Tateishi has since gone on to have extensive coaching experience across Japan and East Asia.

On 29 October 2018, Tateishi was announced to be joining the coaching team of newly appointed Chunichi Dragons manager, Tsuyoshi Yoda, taking up a post as roaming outfield coach.

External links

References

1957 births
Living people
Baseball people from Osaka Prefecture
Japanese baseball players
Nippon Professional Baseball infielders
Nankai Hawks players
Japanese baseball coaches
Nippon Professional Baseball coaches
Uni-President 7-Eleven Lions coaches
Japanese expatriate baseball people in Taiwan
Koos Group Whales coaches